Cromā is an Indian retail chain of consumer electronics and durables run by Infiniti Retail, a subsidiary of the Tata Group. Its product range covers more than 500 products across the electronics and consumer durable categories.

Location 
Presently, there are a total of 300 Cromā stores in 35 cities in India.

The stores are spread across the states of Maharashtra (Latur, Mumbai, Navi Mumbai, Thane, Pune, Nashik, Amravati, Aurangabad, Kolhapur), Gujarat (Ahmedabad, Bhuj, Bhavnagar, Bharuch, Jamnagar, Gandhinagar, Rajkot, Nadiad, Surat, Vapi, Vadodara, Anand), Delhi NCR, Karnataka (Bangalore, Mangalore, Hubli, Mysore, Davangere), Punjab (Amritsar, Jalandhar, Ludhiana, Patiala, Mohali), Chandigarh, Tamil Nadu (Chennai, Coimbatore, Salem, Hosur), Haryana (Gurgaon, Faridabad) Uttar Pradesh (Ghaziabad, Noida), Telangana (Hyderabad, Secunderabad), West Bengal (Kolkata, Asansol), Chhattisgarh (Raipur), Jharkhand (Jamshedpur, Dhanbad), Madhya Pradesh (Gwalior, Indore), and Uttarakhand (Dehradun).

In 2012, Infiniti retail acquired the Indian retail business of Woolworths for A$35 million, or Rs. 200 crore. Woolworths was tied up with Tatas since 2005 for external support in the electronic retail market.

References 

Tata Group
Companies based in Mumbai
Indian brands
2006 establishments in Maharashtra
Indian companies established in 2006
Retail companies of India
Retail companies established in 2006